Hans Martin Hanssen (14 October 1911 – 31 May 1971) was a Norwegian politician for the Labour Party.

He served as a deputy representative to the Parliament of Norway from Finnmark during the term 1950–1953. In total he met during 46 days of parliamentary session.

References

1911 births
1971 deaths
Deputy members of the Storting
Labour Party (Norway) politicians
Finnmark politicians